The National Bank Surveillance System  is a computerized, off-site monitoring system developed by the U.S. Office of the Comptroller of the Currency (OCC) "to assist in the early detection of problem banks and bank management," for the purpose of initiating early corrective action. 

Essentially an early-warning system, the NBSS was first implemented in 1975. It produces Bank Performance Reports (BPRs)  as its primary analytical tool.

Notes

Banking in the United States
Surveillance